The 1878 Parnell by-election was a by-election held on 20 February 1878 in the  electorate during the 6th New Zealand Parliament.

The by-election was caused by the resignation of the incumbent MP Reader Wood on 21 January 1878, to go to England.

The by-election was won by Reader Wood, who had held the seat from 1861 to 1865.

As no other candidates were nominated, he was declared duly elected.

References

Parnell 1878
1878 elections in New Zealand
Politics of the Auckland Region
February 1878 events
1870s in Auckland